Jens Peter Berthelsen (15 December 1854 – 26 July 1934) was a Danish fencer. He competed in the individual foil masters event at the 1900 Summer Olympics.

References

External links

1854 births
1934 deaths
Danish male fencers
fencers at the 1900 Summer Olympics
Olympic fencers of Denmark
People from Hillerød Municipality